= Lukaiasta, California =

Lukaiasta (also Lueayasta) is a former Kalindaruk (related to Ohlone) settlement in Monterey County, California, United States. Its precise location is unknown.
